Rehr is a surname. Notable people with the surname include:

Helen Rehr (1919–2013), American medical social worker
John J. Rehr (graduated 1967), American theoretical physicist

See also
Rohr (surname)